Crambus multilinellus, the multinellus grass-veneer, is a moth in the family Crambidae. It was described by Charles H. Fernald in 1887. It is found in North America, where it has been recorded from Florida, Georgia, Illinois, Maryland, Minnesota, Mississippi, North Carolina, Ontario and South Carolina.

The wingspan is 20–22 mm. Adults are on wing from March to September.

The larvae feed on Gramineae species.

References

Crambini
Moths described in 1887
Moths of North America